727 Tran Hung Dao, also known Saigon or President Building, was a reportedly haunted building located in Ho Chi Minh City. It was also used by the American soldiers on rent during the Vietnam War.

It was originally commissioned by Nguyễn Tấn Đời, a Vietnamese businessman. The building with 530 rooms, divided into 6 blocks and 13 floors was completed in 1960.

History 
The building had thirteen number of floors which, according to local folklore and media reports allegedly killed the workers during its construction process due to "bad luck" believed to be caused by unlucky number, 13.

Later, the architectural engineers called a shaman to address the fear of evil spirit or bad luck. Shaman, according to the local legends, brought dead bodies of four virgins from a "local hospital and buried them at the four corners of the building", in order to avoid any harm from evil spirits.

It is believed the local residents hear screams of horror, the sound of a military parade, in addition to unexpected sight of spectral G.I. walking with Vietnamese girlfriend.

A French architect had warned Doi about the building's unpromising structure such as "13 floors". Prior to its completion, workers witnessed frequent spiritual incidents associated with "13 number". When the building was completed, US troops stayed in the building on rent.

After the war ended, some Vietnamese families stayed in the building, and since then local residents have reportedly experienced screams and the sounds of a military parade.

Later development 
In 2016 or earlier, the local authorities of Ho Chi Minh City stated site clearance in the city, including in 727 Tran Hung Dao. They removed households from the apartment, however ten families refused to leave the site because the compensation rate provided by the authorities was allegedly low.

References 

1960 establishments in Vietnam
2010s disestablishments in Vietnam
Military installations of the United States in South Vietnam
Vietnam
Vietnam